Donald James MacLean (born January 16, 1970) is an American former professional basketball player who played in the National Basketball Association (NBA). He played college basketball for the UCLA Bruins, and became the all-time scoring leader of both the school and the Pac-12 Conference. In 1994, MacLean won the NBA Most Improved Player Award as a member of the Washington Bullets (known now as the Washington Wizards). He currently works as a basketball color analyst.

High school career
Born in Palo Alto, California, MacLean graduated from Simi Valley High School in Simi Valley, California where he was an All-American his senior year.

College career
MacLean played in college at UCLA from 1989 to 1992. He still holds the school record for points scored (2,608) which is also the Pac-12 Conference's (then known as the Pac-10) all-time scoring record, passing Sean Elliott's then record of 2,555 points.  In his senior season, MacLean led UCLA to the 1992 Elite 8. He was inducted into the UCLA Athletics Hall of Fame in 2002.

NBA career
MacLean was the 19th pick (1st round) in the 1992 NBA draft. He was initially drafted by the Detroit Pistons but was traded on draft day to the Washington Bullets.   MacLean, along with his 1994–95 Washington Bullets teammates Rex Chapman, Tom Gugliotta, and Scott Skiles, all reunited in Phoenix in 1999–2000 when Chapman, Gugliotta, and MacLean were Suns players and Skiles was the head coach. As highly productive scoring Bullets teammates in 1994–95, Chapman averaged 11.0 points per game (ranked 4th highest on the team), Gugliotta averaged 16.0 (5th on the team), Skiles averaged 13.0 (6th on the team), and MacLean averaged 11.0 (7th on the team). However, as Suns teammates, Gugliotta averaged 13.7 (5th on the team), Chapman averaged only 6.6 (9th on the team), and MacLean averaged only 2.6 (15th on the team). MacLean is considered by many to have had one of the quickest releases in the game.

In November 2000, the NBA suspended MacLean five games for testing positive for steroids.  He was the first player suspended for steroid use. Charles Barkley later commented "I've seen Don MacLean naked, and he doesn't use steroids."

Broadcasting career
MacLean served as the color analyst on the UCLA Basketball Radio Network.  He is an analyst on the Los Angeles Clippers TV broadcasts on Bally Sports West and Bally Sports SoCal. He also is a weekly basketball contributor on Fox Sports Radio Network's Petros and Money Show. MacLean also serves as the color analyst for various games on the Pac-12 Network.

Personal life
MacLean lives in Southern California with his wife, Brooke, and three sons Kyle, Blake and Trent.

See also

 List of NCAA Division I men's basketball career free throw scoring leaders
 Pac-12 Conference Hall of Honor

References

External links
 

1970 births
Living people
All-American college men's basketball players
American men's basketball players
Basketball players from California
Denver Nuggets players
Detroit Pistons draft picks
McDonald's High School All-Americans
Miami Heat players
New Jersey Nets players
Parade High School All-Americans (boys' basketball)
People from Simi Valley, California
Philadelphia 76ers players
Phoenix Suns players
Power forwards (basketball)
Seattle SuperSonics players
Sportspeople from Palo Alto, California
Sportspeople from Ventura County, California
UCLA Bruins men's basketball players
Washington Bullets players